The rosita patch (Chlosyne rosita) is a butterfly from the family Nymphalidae, similar in appearance to the more common crimson patch. It is a striking butterfly with orange-red patches on the wings. It can be found throughout Central America and Mexico, and is occasional in the southwestern United States.

External links
Butterflies & Moths of North America

rosita
Butterflies of North America
Butterflies described in 1924